Raubtier (German for "predator") is a Swedish industrial metal band from Haparanda. They released their debut album, Det finns bara krig ("There is only war" in English), in 2009.
Their first single, Kamphund ("Attack Dog"), had already become a hit on the Swedish radio station Bandit Rock 106,3. The band's second album, titled Skriet från Vildmarken ("The Call of the Wild"), was released in 2010.

Raubtier toured with Sabaton during Sabaton's "World War Tour" in December 2010 which saw them visit several countries in Scandinavia.

Raubtier released a new single in November 2013 called Qaqortoq which was later included in the upcoming album Pansargryning which was released in May 2014.

A further single, titled Den Sista Kulan ("The Last Bullet") was released at the end of August 2015, again as a teaser for the upcoming album Bärsärkagång, which was later released on 19 February 2016. This album also came in a special edition with commentary from Hulkoff, where he talks about his inspirations and each song's meaning.

Their lyrics are mainly in Swedish, with occasional exceptions, such as Dragunov (English) and Tropaion (partly in Afrikaans).

Members 
Current members
 Pär Hulkoff (Atomkraft, ex-Viperine, and Hulkoff) – vocals, guitar and keyboard
 Jonas Kjellgren – bass
 Mattias "Buffeln" Lind – drums

Previous members
 Waylon – bass
 Hussni Mörsare – bass
 Thorbjörn Englund – bass
 Gustaf Jorde – bass (Defleshed)

Discography

Albums

Track lists

Det Finns Bara Krig (2009) 
("There Is Only War"; released on 25 March 2009)

Skriet Från Vildmarken (2010) 
("Scream from the Wilderness"; released on 22 September 2010; the album title is also the Swedish translation of the title of Jack London's The Call of the Wild)

Från Norrland Till Helvetets Port (2012) 
("From Norrland to the Gates of Hell"; released 25 April 2012)

Pansargryning (2014) 
("Panzer Dawn"; released 5 February 2014)

Bärsärkagång (2016) 
("Berserk Rage"; released 19 February 2016)

Överlevare (2019) 
("Survivor"; released 20 September 2019)

Singles 
Each single contains only its title track.

 Kamphund (2008)
 Achtung Panzer (2009)
 Världsherravälde (2010)
 Lebensgefahr (2010)
 K3 (2010) (digital download)
 Låt Napalmen Regna (2012)
 Sveriges Elit (2012)
 Besten i Mig (2012)
 Qaqortoq (2013)
 Skjut, Gräv, Tig (2013)
 Innan Löven Faller (2014)
 Panzarmarsch (2014)
 Den Sista Kulan (2015)
 Bothniablod (2015)
 Brännmärkt (2015)
 Ovtjarka (2019)
 Bunkern (2019)

References

External links 
 Official website
 Official music video (BD Pop)
 Review on Sputnikmusic
 Raubtier on Sydsvenskan
 Raubtier on BDpop

Industrial rock musical groups
Industrial metal musical groups
Swedish power metal musical groups
Swedish thrash metal musical groups
Swedish rock music groups
Swedish musical trios